Jóannes  is a Faroese  masculine given name. It is a variation of the name Johannes and a cognate of the name John. People bearing the name Jóannes include:

Jóannes Eidesgaard (born 1951), Faroese politician
Jóannes Jakobsen (born 1961),  Faroese footballer 
Jóannes Lamhauge (born 1985), Faroese painter, writer, graphic designer, actor, film director, singer and songwriter
Jóannes Patursson (1866–1946), Faroese nationalist leader and poet

Faroese masculine given names